Consort Su may refer to:

Consorts with the surname Su
Daji ( 11th century BC), consort of King Zhou of Shang, known as Su Daji in popular culture
Imperial Noble Consort Chunhui (1713–1760), concubine of the Qianlong Emperor

Consorts with the title Consort Su
Su-bi Gwon (died 1340), Chungsuk of Goryeo's concubine
Queen Insu (1437–1504), wife of Crown Prince Uigyeong, known as Consort Su before her son Seongjong of Joseon honored her as a queen
Royal Noble Consort Subin Park (1770–1822), concubine of Jeongjo of Joseon